UVA most often refers to:

 Ultraviolet A, a type of ultraviolet radiation
 University of Virginia, a public research university in Charlottesville, Virginia, United States

Uva or UVA may also refer to:

Places
 Uva, Missouri, an unincorporated community, United States
 Uva, Wyoming, an unincorporated community, United States
 Uva Province, a province of Sri Lanka
 Uva College, Badulla, a public school of Sri Lanka
 Uva, a parish in Vimioso, Portugal
 Uva, a location in the Ristijärvi municipality in Finland
 Uva, Russia, a rural locality in Uvinsky District, Udmurt Republic, Russia

Universities
 State University of Vale do Acaraú (Portuguese: Universidade Estadual do Vale do Acaraú, UVA), a university in Ceará, Brazil
 University of Amsterdam (Dutch: Universiteit van Amsterdam, UvA), main university in Amsterdam, Netherlands
 University of Vaasa, main university in Vaasa, Finland
 University of Valladolid, main university in Valladolid, Castile-León, Spain
 Veiga de Almeida University (Portuguese: Universidade Veiga de Almeida, UVA), a university in Rio de Janeiro, Brazil

 University of Virginia, a public research university in Charlottesville, Virginia, United States

People with the surname
 Francisco Uva, (born 1904), Portuguese fencer
 Gonçalo Uva (born 1984), Portuguese rugby player, brother of João and Vasco
 João Uva (born 1980), Portuguese rugby player, brother of Gonçalo and Vasco
 Thomas and Rosemarie Uva, married ex-convicts from Ozone Park, Queens, New York
 Vasco Uva (born 1982), Portuguese rugby player, brother of João and Gonçalo

Other uses
 Uva, the Latin term for the uvea, the pigmented layer of the eye lying beneath the outer layer
 Ultraviolet A, a type of ultraviolet radiation
 Until Victory Always: A Memoir, a book by Gaelic footballer and manager Jim McGuinness
 United Visual Artists, a UK based art and design group
 UVA, the Garner Field's IATA code for an airport near Uvalde, Texas, US
 Uva, one of the two academies in Pokémon Scarlet and Violet